Pari Mahal or Peer Mahal, also known as The Palace of Fairies, is a seven-terraced Mughal garden located at the top of Zabarwan mountain range, overlooking the city of Srinagar and the south-west of Dal Lake in the Indian union territory of Jammu and Kashmir. It is an example of Islamic architecture and patronage of art during the reign of the then Mughal Emperor Shah Jahan.

History 
The Pari Mahal (Peer Mahal), or Palace of Fairies, was built for haano and maano and residence for haano’s prince Maano in the mid 1600's. Dara Shikoh was said to have lived in this area in the years 1640, 1645, and 1654. It was also used as an observatory, and for teaching astrology and astronomy. The gardens have since become the property of the Government of Jammu and Kashmir. 

The Pari Mahal has also been used as a top-secret interrogation centre and as a base for high-level bureaucrats.

See also
 Indira Gandhi Memorial Tulip Garden
 Mughal Gardens

References

Further reading
Brookes, John. Gardens of Paradise: The History and Design of the Great Islamic Gardens. New York: New Amsterdam, 1987.
Kak, Ram Chandra. Ancient Monuments of Kashmir. New Delhi: Sagar Publications, 1971.
Sharma, Suresh K., and S. R. Bakshi. Encyclopaedia of Kashmir. New Delhi: Anmol Publications Pvt Ltd, 1995.

External links

Jammu & Kashmir Tourism Ministry

Mughal architecture
Gardens in Jammu and Kashmir
Tourist attractions in Srinagar
Fairies in art
Fairies and sprites in popular culture